Ledyard is a town in Cayuga County, New York, United States. The population was 1,654 at the 2020 census. The name of the town is from General Benjamin Ledyard, an early settler of the town. Ledyard is on the western edge of the county and is southwest of Auburn.

Wells College, founded as a college for women, is in the village of Aurora.

History 
The south part of Ledyard was in the Central New York Military Tract, and the northern part was a reservation designated for the Cayuga tribe. The first settlers arrived around 1789. The town of Ledyard was founded in 1823 from part of the town of Scipio.

The North Street Friends Meetinghouse was listed on the National Register of Historic Places in 2005.

Rose Marie Belforti, Ledyard's town clerk, refused in 2011 to issue marriage licences to same-sex couples, claiming to do so would violate her "freedom of religion", instead delegating the ministerial task to a deputy. She was re-elected in November of that year.

Notable person
Henry Wells, founder of Wells Fargo and American Express, was from Aurora.

Geography

The town is on the eastern shore of Cayuga Lake, in the Finger Lakes region.

The western town line is the border of Seneca County.

New York State Route 34B and New York State Route 90 are north-south highways in Ledyard.

Demographics

As of the census of 2000, there were 1,832 people, 608 households, and 423 families residing in the town.  The population density was 50.4 people per square mile (19.5/km2).  There were 886 housing units at an average density of 24.4 per square mile (9.4/km2).  The racial makeup of the town was 95.96% White, 0.71% African American, 0.38% Native American, 1.31% Asian, 0.55% from other races, and 1.09% from two or more races. Hispanic or Latino of any race were 1.15% of the population.

There were 608 households, out of which 30.8% had children under the age of 18 living with them, 59.0% were married couples living together, 8.1% had a female householder with no husband present, and 30.4% were non-families. 24.2% of all households were made up of individuals, and 10.5% had someone living alone who was 65 years of age or older.  The average household size was 2.52 and the average family size was 3.03.

In the town, the population was spread out, with 20.4% under the age of 18, 21.3% from 18 to 24, 22.2% from 25 to 44, 23.0% from 45 to 64, and 13.0% who were 65 years of age or older.  The median age was 35 years. For every 100 females, there were 71.4 males.  For every 100 females age 18 and over, there were 65.2 males.

The median income for a household in the town was $42,857, and the median income for a family was $51,842. Males had a median income of $31,719 versus $24,750 for females. The per capita income for the town was $18,231.  About 1.9% of families and 3.4% of the population were below the poverty line, including 1.6% of those under age 18 and 2.4% of those age 65 or over.

Communities and locations in Ledyard 
Aurora – The village of Aurora is on NY-90 and the shore of Cayuga Lake.
Barbers Corners – A location in the northeast of Ledyard.
Black Rock – A hamlet west of Ledyard.
Chapel Corners – A location southeast of Aurora.
Cooneys Corners – A location in the northern part of Ledyard.
Ellis Point – A projection into Cayuga Lake by Levanna.
Ledyard – The hamlet of Ledyard is on the town line in the southwest of the town on NY-34B.
Levanna – A hamlet on NY-90 by the shore of Cayuga Lake, north of Aurora.
Long Point State Park is south of Aurora village.
Prospect Corners – A location southeast of Aurora.
Stony Point – A projection into Cayuga Lake north of the state park.
Turney Corners – A location southeast of Aurora.
Willets – A hamlet on the shore of Cayuga Lake, south of the state park.

References

External links
Town of Ledyard official website

Towns in Cayuga County, New York